Women in Uruguay are women who were born in, who live in, and are from Uruguay. According to Countries and Their Cultures, there is a "very high proportion" of Uruguayan women participating in the labor force of the South American country. The Uruguayan legislation maintains that the women of Uruguay have equal rights to power, authority, and privileges". In reality, however, women are still not occupying "higher economic, professional, political, social, and religious positions". In relation to the political arena, UN Women reported that a 2012 study made by the Inter-Parliamentary Union (IPU) ranked Uruguay as being "103rd out of 189 countries in terms of representation of women in Parliament". Uruguay low ranking is partly due to its low political participation of women: only 16% of members of Parliament are women as of 2014.

Notable women
One prominent Uruguayan woman is Paulina Luisi. Luisi was a leader of the feminist movement in the country of Uruguay. In 1909, she became the first woman in the country to obtain a medical degree and was highly respected. She represented Uruguay in international women's conferences and traveled throughout Europe. She voiced her opinion on women's rights, and in 1919, Paulina started the force for women's rights in Uruguay. By 1922, the Pan-American Conference of Women named Paulina Luisi an honorary vice president of the meeting and she continued to be an activist until Uruguay gave women the right to vote.

Domestic violence
Domestic violence is a very serious problem, especially so-called crimes of passion, which until 2017 were tolerated under Article 36 of the Penal Code (The passion provoked by adultery) – Artículo 36. (La pasión provocada por el adulterio). On December 22, 2017, Article 36 of the Criminal Code was modified to remove the crime of passion. There had been ongoing political efforts to remove this provision from the Criminal Code since 2013. 

Before 2006, perpetrators of rape could avoid punishment if, after the assault, they married the victim. Uruguay's law against domestic violence is Ley Nº 17.514, enacted in 2002. 

According to a 2018 United Nations study, Uruguay has the second-highest rate of killings of women by current or former partners in Latin America, after Dominican Republic.

Abortion

The abortion law of Uruguay is very liberal compared to the other Latin American countries.
In 2012, Uruguay  become the second country in Latin America, after Cuba, to legalize elective abortion (during the first 12 weeks of pregnancy).

Women in politics
Unlike most other Latin American countries, women are not very present in politics. Uruguay has one of the lowest percentage of women in politics in Latin America.

See also
 Uruguayan people
 Culture of Uruguay
 Uruguayan women: dating, marriage, characteristics
 Human trafficking in Uruguay

Further reading
Asunción Lavrin, Women, Feminism and Social Change: Argentina, Chile and Uruguay, 1890–1940 (Nebraska Press, 1995)

References

 
Uruguayan women
Uruguay
Human rights in Uruguay